Ihor Bobovych (born 18 November 1975) is a retired Ukrainian football player. He spend most of his career to Desna Chernihiv.

Career
Bobovych, started his young career in 1992, he played for FC Khimik Chernihiv until 1993, then in the season 1992-1993 he played for Tekstylschyk Chernihiv. In 1993 the coach of Desna Chernihiv, called him and he started his career in the main club of Chernihiv. In 2001 he moved Chornomorets Odesa, the main city of Odesa, where he won the Ukrainian First League in the season 2001–02 and he got promoted to Ukrainian Premier League. In 2007 he moved to FC Smorgon a team in Belarus, where he played almost 6 games and scored 1 goal. In 2017 he gave an interview at the Desna Chernihiv, where he spoke about the improvement of the team of Chernihiv.

Honours
Tekstylschyk Chernihiv
 Chernihiv Oblast Football Federation: 1993

Desna Chernihiv
 Ukrainian Second League: 1996–97, 2005–06

References

External links 
Profile on website 
Profile on footballfacts.ru 

1975 births
Living people
Footballers from Chernihiv
Ukrainian footballers
Ukrainian expatriate footballers
Expatriate footballers in Belarus
Ukrainian expatriate sportspeople in Belarus
FC Khimik Chernihiv players
FC Cheksyl Chernihiv players
FC Desna Chernihiv players
FC Nyva Vinnytsia players
FC Chornomorets Odesa players
FC Chornomorets-2 Odesa players
FC Polissya Zhytomyr players
FC Smorgon players
Association football forwards